La Rioja is an autonomous community and province in Spain, in the north of the Iberian Peninsula. Its capital is Logroño. Other cities and towns in the province include Calahorra, Arnedo, Alfaro, Haro, Santo Domingo de la Calzada, and Nájera. It has an estimated population of 315,675 inhabitants (INE 2018), making it the least populated autonomous community of Spain.

It covers part of the Ebro valley towards its north and the Iberian Range in the south. The community is a single province, so there is no County Council, and it is organized into 174 municipalities. It borders the Basque Country (province of Álava) to the north, Navarre to the northeast, Aragón to the southeast (province of Zaragoza), and Castilla y León to the west and south (provinces of Burgos and Soria).

The area was once occupied by pre-Roman Berones, Pellendones and Vascones. After partial recapture from the Muslims in the early tenth century, the region became part of the Kingdom of Pamplona, later being incorporated into Castile after a century and a half of disputes. From the eighteenth century the Rioja region remained divided between the provinces of Burgos and Soria, until in 1833 the province of Logroño was created, changing the name of the province to La Rioja in 1980 as a prelude to its constitution under a single provincial autonomous community in 1982. The name "Rioja" (from Río Oja) is first attested in 1099.

The region is well known for its wines under the brand Denominación de Origen Calificada Rioja.

History

Roman and Muslim periods

In Roman times, the territory of La Rioja was inhabited by the tribes of the Berones (central country), Autrigones (upper country, extending also north and west of it) and the Vascones (lower country, extending also north and east of it). It was part of the province of Hispania Tarraconensis.

In medieval times, La Rioja was often a disputed territory. The Visigoths created the Duchy of Cantabria that probably included most of La Rioja, as a border march against the Vascones. After the Muslim invasion of AD 711, La Rioja fell into the Muslim domains of Al Andalus.

Medieval period
Most of the territory was reconquered in 923 by Sancho I of Pamplona, acting for the Kingdom of Pamplona together with the Kingdom of León and the Counts of Castile, feudal lords of the Leonese King. The lower region around Arnedo came under control of his allies the Banu Qasi of Tudela. The territory to the east of the Leza River remained under Muslim control.

Later there was a dispute between Count Fernán González of Castile and the kings of Pamplona-Navarra, involving great battles. It was decided in favour of the Navarrese after the imprisonment of the Count's family in Cirueña, in 960. La Rioja briefly formed the independent Kingdom of Viguera from 970 to about 1005, at which point it became a part of the Kingdom of Pamplona.

Sancho Garcés moved the capital of the Kingdom of Pamplona to Nájera (La Rioja), creating the so-called kingdom of Nájera-Pamplona which was, due to its large size, the first Spanish Empire. After the independence of Castile in 1035, this new kingdom fiercely fought against Pamplona for the possession of Bureba, La Rioja and other territories. In 1076, after the murder of Sancho IV, Navarre was divided among Castile and Aragon. Castile obtained La Rioja, together with other Navarrese lands. The name "La Rioja" first appears in written records in the Miranda de Ebro charter of 1099. The territory was centred on the fortified site of Logroño: the 12th-century church Iglesia de Santa Maria de Palacio recalls its origin as a chapel of the administrative palace. Logroño was a borderland disputed between the kings of Navarre and the kings of Castile from the 10th century;

From 1134 the Navarrese under García Ramírez ("the Restorer") and his son Sancho VI ("the Wise") fought bitterly with Castile for the recovery of the former Pamplonese domains. The region was awarded to Castile in a judgement by Henry II of England and annexed in 1177. Its importance lay in part in the pilgrimage route to Santiago de Compostela, the Camino de Santiago, which crossed the River Ebro on the stone bridge, the Puente de Piedra.

Province of Logroño

Up to the 19th century the territory remained divided between the provinces of Burgos and Soria. The region was taken by Napoleonic forces in the Peninsular War and remained solidly in French hands until 1814. In the 1810 project of Llorente it was to be a part of the prefecture of Arlanzón with its capital in Burgos. The Cortes of Cádiz declared La Rioja an independent province at the time of the Liberal Constitution of 1812, and during the Liberal Triennium in January 1822 the province of Logroño was created by royal decree as part of the administrative reform of Riego, taking in the whole of the historical territory of La Rioja. However, Ferdinand VII soon annulled these decisions and restored most of the previous territorial divisions. In the 1833 reorganization, a province of Logroño was again formed within the region of Castilla la Vieja. The province increased its territory temporarily in 1841.

Autonomous community
In 1980 the province changed its name to La Rioja, and following the adoption of the Estatuto de San Millán in 1982, during the reorganization following the Spanish transition to democracy, it was constituted as a uni-provincial autonomous community,. It is the second-smallest autonomous community in Spain and has the smallest population; half of its 174 municipalities have populations under 200. Nearly half of its citizens live in the capital.

Geography

La Rioja is bordered by the Basque Country (province of Álava), Navarre, Aragón (province of Zaragoza), and Castile and León (provinces of Soria and Burgos). The river Ebro flows through this region, as does the river Oja, after which it is named.

The Ebro runs through the north of the community. The entire right bank (which is to the south) belongs to La Rioja. There are only three municipalities, Briñas, San Vicente de la Sonsierra and Ábalos on the left bank (known as the Riojan Sonsierra), although Logroño, Agoncillo, Alcanadre, Rincón de Soto and Alfaro also have parts of their respective municipal territories on that bank. Because of their proximity, the Álava area between the Ebro and the Sierra de Cantabria is called Rioja Alavesa.

Climate

The climate is mainly continental. The Rioja Alta comarca receives more precipitation than Rioja Baja. The wind called Cierzo is very frequent around La Rioja during the winter.

Mountains and mountain ranges
The mountains in La Rioja are part of the Iberian System. Other mountains include Sierra de Camero Viejo, Sierra de Camero Nuevo, Sierra de Cebollera, and Picos de Urbión.

Hydrography

The Ebro is the main river passing through the community. The river therefore flows very quickly through La Rioja.

Seven rivers descend rapidly towards the Ebro from the mountain range, which is why La Rioja is sometimes called: "Zone of the seven valleys". They are, from east to west, Alhama, Cidacos, Leza, Iregua, Najerilla, Oja and Tirón, although the headwaters of the Alhama and Cidacos originate in Soria and those of Najerilla-Neila and Tirón are from Burgos. Sometimes Linares (a tributary of Alhama) is added, grouping Tirón with its tributary, the Oja.

All the rivers of these valleys form tributaries that go on to form many valleys in their own right, such as those of Linares, Ocon, Jubera, Tuerto, Brieva, Viniegras and San Millán. There is an almost unlimited number of grandiose canyons, quite splendid in nature, such as Aguas Buenas, Nieva, Manzanares, Ardancha, Navajún, Valderresa, Ollora, Tobia, San Martín and others.

Flora and fauna
In the highlands oaks, beech and pine are grown. There are also thickets of juniper, boxwood, sloes, holly and cistus. Thyme, rosemary, common juniper, and holm oak are present. There are grand hillsides with fine pasture for livestock, cattle and sheep. In the lower areas there are oaks, olive and almond trees. Near the Ebro, in the plains, the land is used for cereal, sugar beet and potatoes, while the hills are covered with vast vineyards of the wine that has brought worldwide fame to this region.

All Riojan rivers, including the Ebro, have a row of poplars and cottonwood. About the Riojan Alamos Ana Maria Matute has written: "... see them on the edge of the water, turning the landscape, like spears magical pointing towards the unreal and mysterious country of the riverbed."

Natural resources
Gypsum and silica are mined. Arnedillo is a spa town.

Dinosaur footprints

During the Early Cretaceous period the geographical area of Cameros was part of a flooded plain that drained periodically, leaving behind muddy areas where dinosaur tracks marked the path. Eventually they were dried and covered with new sediment layers whose weight pressed down on the lower layers, causing them to solidify into rocks over millions of years. Erosion has been wearing down the upper layers making many of these rock formations visible, bringing into view the fossilized footprints. La Rioja is notable for the number and conservation of these sites, in addition to those found in the north of Soria, such as Yanguas, Santa Cruz de Yanguas and other highland locations.

Comarcas

Geographical comarcas:
 Rioja Alta
 Comarca de Anguiano
 Comarca de Ezcaray
 Comarca de Haro
 Comarca de Nájera
 Comarca de Santo Domingo de la Calzada
 Rioja Media
 Tierra de Cameros
 Camero Nuevo
 Camero Viejo
 Comarca de Logroño
 Rioja Baja
 Comarca de Cervera
 Comarca de Alfaro
 Comarca de Arnedo
 Comarca de Calahorra

Economy

The Gross domestic product (GDP) of the autonomous community was 8.5 billion euros in 2018, accounting for 0.7% of Spanish economic output. GDP per capita adjusted for purchasing power was 29,200 euros or 97% of the EU27 average in the same year. The GDP per employee was 102% of the EU average.La Rioja is known for its production of Rioja DOCa wines (although the Rioja viticultural region extends slightly into the neighboring administrative regions of Álava and Navarra).

Agriculture
There is dryland farming of wheat, barley and grape; irrigated cultivation of asparagus, capsicum and other crops; and animal husbandry of sheep.

Industry
Types of industry include wine production and conserves (in Logroño, Cenicero, Haro and Calahorra); textiles and footwear (in Logroño, Arnedo, Cervera del Río Alhama and Ezcaray); furniture manufacturing (in Ezcaray, Logroño and Nájera); rubber, plastics, chemical products and transport machinery; and chorizo, made in Casalarreina.

Exports are directed mostly towards the European Union, United States and Canada.

La Rioja hosts the annual Battle of Wine festival in the village of Haro. Another famous local festival is the Toro de fuego, where a metal frame in the shape of a bull is carried among festival goers, which also takes place in Haro.

Demographics
According to the INE the population of La Rioja (as at 2018) is 315,675 inhabitants, with 155,758 men and 159,917 women. Its population density is 62.57 people per km2. It is the least populous autonomous community in Spain. Its capital, Logroño, with approximately 151,113 inhabitants, is its most populous city.

La Rioja has 174 municipalities. According to the same INE data, there are more men than women in 150 of them, in two the numbers are the same and in 22 there are more females than males. In the latter set, the differences are small, except in the capital where there are 4,868 more women than men.

Major cities

Education
According to the 2007 PISA report, education in La Rioja is of the highest quality in Spain, close to that of other European countries with better overall educational levels in terms of student knowledge. In the Ministry of Education's 2009 report La Rioja was in first position among the autonomous communities as it relates to general aspects of primary and secondary education.

It is placed above the Spanish average in the list of communities with the lowest levels of school failure, with 85% of students being able to obtain the ESO title, despite its schools having the highest proportion of enrolled immigrants.

6,208 euros are spent per pupil, making it the tenth ranked community in this regard. The majority of educational institutions in the community are public, followed by subsidized and private schools, the latter of which are very scarce at the primary and secondary levels. The bachillerato is free in public schools and at a cost in charter schools.

In La Rioja the portion of the population with higher education is 30.6%, with two institutions offering studies at this level: the University of La Rioja and an online university, the International University of La Rioja.

Transportation

La Rioja has connections by air via the Logroño-Agoncillo Airport.

Rail journeys to Madrid, Zaragoza, Barcelona, Valladolid, Oviedo, Bilbao, La Coruña, Vigo are possible, since the Castejón-Miranda line crosses the region from east to west. The main railway station is that at Logroño.

Roads between La Rioja and neighboring regions are primarily through the AP-68. Additional highways have been built, such as the Autovía A-12 which connects Pamplona to Logroño since 2006, and in the future will reach Burgos. Other major road routes include:
N-111
N-232
N-120
Autopista AP-69 (proposed)
Piqueras Tunnel
Puerto de Oncala
Puerto de Piqueras

Government and politics

The current President of La Rioja is Concha Andreu of PSOE. The autonomous community has its own Parliament. Other organs include the Consejo de Gobierno (council of government) and the Tribunal Superior de Justicia (high court of justice).

Monuments
 Monastery of Santa María la Real of Najera
 Concatedral de Santa María de la Redonda
 Catedral de Santo Domingo de la Calzada
 Iglesia de Santo Tomás
 Abbey of Santa María de San Salvador of Cañas

Notable people

Ángel Iturriaga Barco
Celso Morga Iruzubieta
Dani Aranzubia
Domingo de Silos
Fausto Elhuyar
Fortunato Pablo Urcey
Francisco Javier de Lizana y Beaumont
Gonzalo de Berceo
Gustavo Bueno
José Ortiz-Echagüe
Juan José Elhuyar
Manuel Bretón de los Herreros
Martín Fernández de Navarrete
Práxedes Mateo Sagasta

See also 
List of presidents of the Parliament of La Rioja
Dulzaina, a popular musical instrument from La Rioja.
Jota (music), a popular dance practiced in some comarcas of La Rioja.
Caparrones, one of the most important dishes in Riojan cooking.
History of Rioja wine

References

External links

Government of La Rioja 
Tourism in La Rioja

 
NUTS 2 statistical regions of the European Union
States and territories established in 1982
Autonomous communities of Spain

hr:La Rioja